Nathaniel Ewing (June 17, 1848 – March 28, 1914) was a United States district judge of the United States District Court for the Western District of Pennsylvania.

Education and career

Born in Uniontown, Pennsylvania, Ewing received an Artium Baccalaureus degree from Princeton University in 1869 and an Artium Magister degree from the same institution in 1872. He was in private practice in Uniontown from 1871 to 1887. He was a Judge of the 14th Judicial District of Pennsylvania from 1887 to 1899, returning to private practice in Uniontown from 1900 to 1906.

Federal judicial service

Ewing received a recess appointment from President Theodore Roosevelt on September 25, 1906, to a seat on the United States District Court for the Western District of Pennsylvania vacated by Judge Joseph Buffington. He was nominated to the same position by President Roosevelt on December 3, 1906. He was confirmed by the United States Senate on December 11, 1906, and received his commission the same day. His service terminated on January 31, 1908, due to his resignation.

Later career and death

Ewing was then Chairman of the Pennsylvania State Railroad Commission from 1908 to 1913, and Chairman of the Public Service Commission of Pennsylvania from 1913 to 1914. He died on March 28, 1914.

References

Sources
 

1848 births
1914 deaths
Judges of the United States District Court for the Western District of Pennsylvania
United States district court judges appointed by Theodore Roosevelt
20th-century American judges
People from Uniontown, Pennsylvania
19th-century American judges